Bayesian linear regression is a type of conditional modeling in which the mean of one variable is described by a linear combination of other variables, with the goal of obtaining the posterior probability of the regression coefficients (as well as other parameters describing the distribution of the regressand) and ultimately allowing the out-of-sample prediction of the regressand (often labelled ) conditional on observed values of the regressors (usually ). The simplest and most widely used version of this model is the normal linear model, in which  given  is distributed Gaussian. In this model, and under a particular choice of prior probabilities for the parameters—so-called conjugate priors—the posterior can be found analytically. With more arbitrarily chosen priors, the posteriors generally have to be approximated.

Model setup
Consider a standard linear regression problem, in which for  we specify the mean of the conditional distribution of  given a  predictor vector :

This corresponds to the following likelihood function:

The ordinary least squares solution is used to estimate the coefficient vector using the Moore–Penrose pseudoinverse:

In the Bayesian approach, the data are supplemented with additional information in the form of a prior probability distribution. The prior can take different functional forms depending on the domain and the information that is available a priori.

Only under the assumption of (weak) exogeneity can the joint likelihood be factored into . The latter part is usually ignored under the assumption of disjoint parameter sets. More so, under classic assumptions  are considered chosen (for example, in a designed experiment) and therefore has a known probability without parameters.

With conjugate priors

Conjugate prior distribution
For an arbitrary prior distribution, there may be no analytical solution for the posterior distribution. In this section, we will consider a so-called conjugate prior for which the posterior distribution can be derived analytically.

Write

The likelihood is now re-written as

where

where  is the number of regression coefficients.

This suggests a form for the prior:

where  is an inverse-gamma distribution

Equivalently, it can also be described as a scaled inverse chi-squared distribution, 

Further the conditional prior density  is a normal distribution,

In the notation of the normal distribution, the conditional prior distribution is

Posterior distribution

With the prior now specified, the posterior distribution can be expressed as

With some re-arrangement, the posterior can be re-written so that the posterior mean  of the parameter vector  can be expressed in terms of the least squares estimator  and the prior mean , with the strength of the prior indicated by the prior precision matrix 

Now the posterior can be expressed as a normal distribution times an inverse-gamma distribution:

Therefore, the posterior distribution can be parametrized as follows.

which illustrates Bayesian inference being a compromise between the information contained in the prior and the information contained in the sample.

Model evidence
The model evidence  is the probability of the data given the model . It is also known as the marginal likelihood, and as the prior predictive density. Here, the model is defined by the likelihood function  and the prior distribution on the parameters, i.e. . The model evidence captures in a single number how well such a model explains the observations. The model evidence of the Bayesian linear regression model presented in this section can be used to compare competing linear models by Bayesian model comparison. These models may differ in the number and values of the predictor variables as well as in their priors on the model parameters.

This integral can be computed analytically and the solution is given in the following equation.

Here  denotes the gamma function.

Note that this equation is nothing but a re-arrangement of Bayes theorem. Inserting the formulas for the prior, the likelihood, and the posterior and simplifying the resulting expression leads to the analytic expression given above.

Other cases
In general, it may be impossible or impractical to derive the posterior distribution analytically. However, it is possible to approximate the posterior by an approximate Bayesian inference method such as Monte Carlo sampling or variational Bayes.

The special case  is called ridge regression.

A similar analysis can be performed for the general case of the multivariate regression and part of this provides for Bayesian estimation of covariance matrices: see Bayesian multivariate linear regression.

See also
 Bayes linear statistics
 Constrained least squares
 Regularized least squares
 Tikhonov regularization
 Spike and slab variable selection
 Bayesian interpretation of kernel regularization

Notes

References

External links
 Bayesian estimation of linear models (R programming wikibook). Bayesian linear regression as implemented in R.

Linear regression
Single-equation methods (econometrics)